The 2018 EHF European Men's Handball Championship was the 13th edition and was hosted for the second time in Croatia from 12 to 28 January 2018. Croatia was awarded hosting the tournament during the EHF congress in Dublin on 20 September 2014.

Spain won their first title after defeating Sweden 29–23 in the final. France captured the bronze medal after defeating Denmark 32–29.

Venues

Qualification

Qualified teams

Note: Bold indicates champion for that year. Italic indicates host for that year.

Draw
The draw was held on 23 June 2017.

Seeding
The seedings were announced on 19 June 2017.

Squads

Match officials
On 26 October 2017, 12 couples were announced.

Preliminary round
All times are local (UTC+1).

Group A

Group B

Group C

Group D

Main round
Points and goals gained in the preliminary group against teams that advanced, were taken over.

Group I

Group II

Knockout stage

Bracket

Semifinals

Fifth place game

Third place game

Final

Ranking and statistics

Final ranking

All-Star Team
The all-star team and awards were announced on 28 January 2018.

Awards

Statistics

Top goalscorers

Source: Sportresult

Top goalkeepers

Source: Sportresult

References

External links
Official website

 
2018
European Men's Handball Championship
Handball
European Men's Handball Championship
International handball competitions hosted by Croatia
European Men's Handball Championship
Sport in Varaždin
Sports competitions in Split, Croatia
Sports competitions in Zagreb
2010s in Zagreb
Sports competitions in Poreč
21st century in Split, Croatia